The 1996 Lao League was the seventh season of top flight football in Laos. Lao Army FC won the championship, their sixth championship in the last seven seasons.

References

Lao Premier League seasons
Laos
Laos
1